Steven Weiss may refer to:
 Stephen H. Weiss (1935–2008), American investment banker, philanthropist
 Steven I. Weiss, Orthodox Jewish journalist and blogger
 Stephen Weiss (born 1983), Canadian ice hockey player
 Stephen E. Weiss, professor of policy and international business

See also
 Steve Weisberg (born 1963), American composer, recording artist, and producer
 Steve Weissman, American sportscaster
 Steven Weissman (born 1968), American  alternative cartoonist